The SMASH is a type of remote controlled weapon station manufactured by Aselsan of Turkey. The system is fitted with 30mm Mk44 Bushmaster II auto-cannon.

Overview
The weapon is mounted on a stabilized pedestal mounting which allows it to remain on target as the platform beneath it moves. The mounting does not penetrate the platform (except cables), making it relatively simple to fit the weapon to ships.

The electroptical suit of SMASH is independent and separately stabilized. This enables surveillance and target tracking without aiming the gun to the target. Using its sight, the SMASH system can provide surveillance and target-tracking entirely without outside assistance, allowing it to function fully independently. It also can be integrated with the combat management system of a ship. Its integrated training simulator provides crew training. There is also a manual operation mode as a back-up.

150 (2 x 75) rounds are carried on the mounting with dual feed system. The mount can traverse 360° when EO sights elevate between -30° to +80° and gun elevate between -20° to +70°. The system can be used during day and night under various weather.

Operators

Padma-class patrol vessel: Each of the five Padma-class Batch-2 patrol vessels will be fitted with one Aselsan SMASH as primary armament.

Croatian Navy: Croatian Coast Guard division
Omiš-class patrol boat: Fitted with one Aselsan SMASH as primary armament.

 Indonesian Maritime Security Agency
 Tanjung Datu-class offshore patrol vessel: Fitted with one Aselsan SMASH as primary armament.
 Pulau Nipah-class offshore patrol vessel: Each of the three Pulau Nipah-class OPVs will be fitted with one Aselsan SMASH as primary armament.

Malaysian Maritime Enforcement Agency
Tun Fatimah-class offshore patrol vessel: Each of the three Tun Fatimah-class OPVs will be fitted with one Aselsan SMASH as primary armament.
Bagan Datuk-class patrol vessel: Each of the six Bagan Datuk-class PVs fitted with one Aselsan SMASH as primary armament.

Philippine Navy
Jose Rizal-class frigate: Each of the two Jose Rizal-class frigates are fitted with one Aselsan SMASH as secondary armament.

References

Remote weapon stations
Aselsan products